KWEM-LP was a low-power television station in Stillwater, Oklahoma, broadcasting locally in analog on UHF channel 31 as a part-time affiliate of America One. Founded January 17, 1995, the station was owned by Westwood Media Group, Inc. It devoted a significant part of its schedule to locally produced programming, including a morning and evening newscast and Oklahoma State University athletics, as well as an auction TV show well known among local residents for the random and unusual selection of items sold.

On April 7, 2011, the Federal Communications Commission cancelled the station's license and deleted the KWEM-LP call sign from its database.

References

External links

 Station website

WEM-LP (defunct)
Television channels and stations established in 1995
1995 establishments in Oklahoma
Television channels and stations disestablished in 2011
2011 disestablishments in Oklahoma
Defunct television stations in the United States
Stillwater, Oklahoma
WEM-LP